As a kind of "tradition", the most watched Brazilian TV program annually is 9PM telenovela of Rede Globo. For the 2015-16 season, will be released two novelas for this time, with a minimum target of 35 points. The first, Babilônia (English title: Babylon) is written by Gilberto Braga, Ricardo Linhares and João Ximenes Braga, and has been broadcasting since Monday, March 16, 2015, at  9:30 p.m. / 10:45 p.m. (BRT/AMT).

Table

Audience

March
DebutIn his debut, Babilônia has acquired an Ibope Rating of 31 points in the preliminary numbers, representing the worst debut of a 9PM telenovela in all time. However, in the final numbers, this index increased two points, and the debut recorded 33 points, with 50% share. At the same time, Carrossel (SBT - 8 points) and Vitória (Record - 6 points), had a good performance. This represents that 6.534 million viewers watched this chapter in Greater São Paulo. Compared to the two predecessors, the debut index surpassed Império (32 points) and tied with Em Família (33 points).

In Rio, the debut recorded 35 points of average, surpassing its two predecessors Império and Em Família (both with 34 points). This represents that 4,884 million people watched.

In Salvador, the audience was 40 points, one of the highest ratings of debut nationwide.

First weekIn the second chapter, recorded 29.8 (30) points, down 9%. Fell short of its predecessor, Império (35 points), but overcame Em Família (29 points). In the third and fourth chapter, the ratings continued to fall, registering 29 points. In the same period, SBT, with a rerun of Carrossel, had a great performance, registering 12.5 and 12.6 respectively. On Friday and Saturday, the audience remained low, recording 26 and 23 points respectively. At the end of the first week, Babilônia lost a third of its public.

Second weekIn the second week, the audience continued to fall in São Paulo. On March 23, in the preliminary numbers, Babilônia recorded 23.3 points, one of the worst audiences of all time. Before, the Jornal Nacional recorded 20 points. But the next day, the Ibope reported that there was an error in the measurement in real time and adjusted the numbers of the attractions displayed after 6PM (access prime). There was an increase of 6 points between the preliminary and final numbers: 29 points. In Rio, the performance was better: 35 points. On Tuesday (24), fell by 3 points, and recorded 26. On Wednesday (25), soccer day on television, where the duration of the telenovela is shorter, Babilônia recorded 24.9 points in the preliminary numbers, against 25.2 of Alto Astral (7PM telenovela) and 27.8 of Big Brother Brasil 15, being one of the rare times in the Brazilian television history that 9PM telenovela is not the most watched program of the day. Throughout the week, the numbers remained stable.

April
Third weekOn Monday (3/30), recorded 24 points, an historically low rating for the time slot.

References

Babilônia (TV series)